Figure skating at the 1928 Winter Olympics took place at the Olympic Ice Rink in St. Moritz, Switzerland, between 14 and 19 February 1928. Three figure skating events were contested: men's singles, ladies' singles, and pair skating.

Unseasonably warm weather in St. Moritz during the Games caused difficulty for the figure skating events, as the ice surface was outdoors. There was a proposal to move the competition to an indoor rink in Berlin or London, but colder weather returned before a decision could be made. However, the ice surface remained in poor condition for the duration of the Games. During the ladies' free skating, red flags were placed on the ice to mark the especially bad areas, which became more numerous as the competition progressed.

Medal summary

Medalists

Medal table
Again only Austria was able to win more than one medal but this time without winning a gold medal.

Participating nations
Twelve figure skater (seven men and five ladies) competed in both the singles and the pairs event.

A total of 51 figure skaters (23 men and 28 ladies) from eleven nations (men from eleven nations and ladies from eleven nations) competed at the St. Moritz Games:

  (men 4, women 5)
  (men 1, women 1)
  (men 2, women 3)
  (men 2, women 1)
  (men 2, women 1)
  (men 1, women 2)
  (men 3, women 5)
  (men 3, women 2)
  (men 0, women 4)
  (men 1, women 0)
  (men 1, women 1)
  (men 3, women 3)

References

External links

 International Olympic Committee results database

 
1928 Winter Olympics events
1928
1928 in figure skating
International figure skating competitions hosted by Switzerland